Marcin Piotr Kierwiński (born 22 August 1976 in Warsaw) is a polish politician, local government official, Deputy Marshal of the 3rd and 4th term of Mazovia from 2010 to 2011, Member of Parliament of the 7th, 8th and 9th term, secretary of state in the Prime Minister's Chancellery and head of the political cabinet of Prime Minister Ewa Kopacz in 2015 and general secretary of the Civic Platform from 2020

References 

1976 births
Living people
Civic Platform politicians
Members of the Polish Sejm 2011–2015
Members of the Polish Sejm 2015–2019
Members of the Polish Sejm 2019–2023